Javier Bardem is a Spanish actor and producer who made his acting debut as a child in an episode of the Spanish television series El Pícaro (1974). Bardem made his feature film debut with a minor role in the 1990 Spanish erotic film Las edades de Lulú. The film's director Bigas Luna was impressed by Bardem, giving him his first leading role in the romantic-comedy Jamón Jamón (1992), alongside future wife Penélope Cruz. In 1993, Bardem starred in another Luna film, Huevos de Oro, and in the Vicente Aranda-directed El Amante Bilingüe. The following year he appeared in Días contados (1994) and El detective y la muerte (1994). For both films he was nominated for the San Sebastián International Film Festival Award for Best Actor.

His first role in an English-language film was as the jailed Cuban dissident Reinaldo Arenas in Before Night Falls (2000), for which he won the Volpi Cup for Best Actor and was nominated for the Academy Award for Best Actor. In 2002, he appeared in the John Malkovich-directed The Dancer Upstairs and the Fernando León de Aranoa-directed Mondays in the Sun. In 2004, he starred alongside Tom Cruise in the Michael Mann-directed Collateral. He won a second Volpi Cup for Best Actor in 2004, for portraying euthanasia activist Ramón Sampedro in The Sea Inside. His next role was as psychopathic assassin Anton Chigurh in the Coen brothers film No Country for Old Men (2007), for which he received the Golden Globe Award for Best Supporting Actor – Motion Picture and Academy Award for Best Supporting Actor. He was the first Spanish actor to win an Oscar. Bardem next appeared in the 2008 Woody Allen film Vicky Cristina Barcelona, for which he received the Golden Globe Award for Best Actor – Motion Picture Musical or Comedy. He then starred in Biutiful (2010), garnering Bardem the Cannes Film Festival Award for Best Actor.

In 2012, Bardem narrated the Spanish documentary Sons of the Clouds, The Last Colony, which received a Goya Award for Best Documentary. That year he also portrayed the Bond villain Raoul Silva in Skyfall (2012), which earned him a Satellite Award for Best Supporting Actor. The following year he starred in the Ridley Scott-directed The Counselor (2013). Bardem then collaborated with Sean Penn on The Gunman (2015) and The Last Face (2016). In 2017, he played the antagonist in Pirates of the Caribbean: Dead Men Tell No Tales and starred in Mother! He was nominated for a Golden Raspberry Award for Worst Supporting Actor for both performances. That year he also portrayed Pablo Escobar in Loving Pablo opposite his wife Penélope Cruz. Bardem portrayed Stilgar in Dune (2021), his first science fiction film since Autómata (2014). That same year, Bardem portrayed Desi Arnez in Being the Ricardos and his performance earned him another nomination for the Academy Award for Best Actor.

Film

Television

See also
 List of awards and nominations received by Javier Bardem

References

External links
 
 Javier Bardem at the Rotten Tomatoes

Bardem family
Male actor filmographies
Spanish filmographies